Sevan Kirder (born 9 February 1980) is the flutist/bagpiper for the Swiss band Red Shamrock (Celtic Folk).

Career 
He is best known for his work in Eluveitie (Pagan metal) which he left on 4 June 2008.

Privates 
Sevan played a long time in Eluveitie with his twinbrother Rafi and he is of Armenian descent.

Equipment 
Flute Pearl PF-501
Irish Flute by Thomas Aebi
Tin/Lowwhistle by Susato
Galician Bagpipe by Seivane
E-Pipe by redpipes

Discography

With Eluveitie 
Vên (2003) – EPSpirit (2006) – CDSlania (2008) – CDLive at Metalcamp – (2008) – CDSlania / Evocation I – The Arcane Metal Hammer Edition – (2009) – CDThe Early Years – (2012) – CD

 With Red Shamrock Mosaic / Mirror (2003) – EPas hot as irish... (2004) – CDfrom the ashes (2006) – CDdesert snow (2008) – CDdeman's playground (2012) – CD
Thunder Sails the Sea (2016) – CD

 With Inish the calm before the storm (2008) – CD

 With Finsterforst Weltenkraft (2007) – CD...zum Tode hin (2008) – CDRastlos (2012) – CDMach Dich Frei (2015) – CD#YØLØ (2016) – EPZerfall (2019) – CDJenseits (2022) – EP

 With Bulwark Variance (2009) – CD

 With Minhyriath Grohnd (2009) – CD

 With Windfærer Tribus'' (2010) – CD

References

External links 

Official Eluveitie website
Official Red Shamrock website

1980 births
Living people
Swiss rock musicians
Swiss flautists
Swiss people of Armenian descent